Little Yellow Mountain is a mountain in the North Carolina High Country and wholly in the Pisgah National Forest.  Its elevation reaches , it is on the border between Avery and Mitchell counties. The mountain generates feeder streams for the North Toe River.

Though named Little Yellow Mountain, it is actually  taller than nearby Big Yellow Mountain.

The future goal is to transfer the land to the North Carolina State Parks System, becoming part of the Yellow Mountain State Natural Area.

Macon County 

See also
List of mountains in North Carolina

References

Mountains of North Carolina
Mountains of Avery County, North Carolina
Landforms of Mitchell County, North Carolina